Stade Briochin, founded in 1904, are a French association football team based in Saint-Brieuc, France. As from the 2020–21 season they play in the Championnat National, the third tier in the French football league system. They play at the Stade Fred Aubert in Saint-Brieuc, which can hold 11,000 fans.

They have played for the majority of their existence at the amateur levels of the French football league system, but did spend three seasons in the second tier of the professional league during the period 1993–1997, before suffering liquidation and an enforced relegation to fifth tier.

History
Until 1959, Stade Briochin competed in the Ligue de Bretagne, the regional amateur league of Brittany. For five of the next ten years they contested the Championnat de France Amateur, which at the time was the top tier of Amateur football. They competed around this level, as the French football league system restructured itself, until 1988 when they were relegated from the Ligue de Bretagne Division Honneur (the fifth tier, in effect, at this stage) to the Ligue de Bretagne Division Supérieure Régionale.

From the 1988–89 season, the club won promotions in three out of four seasons, and in 1993–94 they finished 6th in Division 2, which is still their highest finish to date.

In the 1996–97 season, the club started to suffer from debt issues, and on 24 March 1997 they were liquidated by order of court and administratively relegated from the professional football league.

The club restarted in Championnat de France Amateur 2 for the 1997–98 season, falling to the Ligue de Bretagne Division Honneur (now the sixth tier) in 2008 and further to the Ligue de Bretagne Division Supérieure Élite (seventh tier) in 2011. Successive promotions in 2012 and 2013 brought the club back to CFA 2.

In the 2019–2020 season they won promotion to the Championnat National by being top of the Championnat National 2 Group B table when the season was curtailed due to the COVID-19 pandemic.

Honours

Professional Competition
 Championnat National: Champions (Group A) 1996

National Amateur Competition
 Division 3: Champions (West Group) 1993
 Division 4: Champions (Group D) 1991
 Championnat de France Amateur 2: 2017

Regional Amateur Competition
 Division Honneur (Ligue de l'Ouest) 1959, 1968, 1974, 1990
 Division Honneur (Brittany): 2013

Current squad
As of 1 February 2023.

References

External links
 

 
Association football clubs established in 1904
1904 establishments in France
Sport in Côtes-d'Armor
Saint-Brieuc
Football clubs in Brittany